Causa Galiza (Cause Galiza or Galician Cause) is a Galician left-wing Galician pro-independence political party. It was formed in 2012, and transformed itself in a political party in March 2014. In the 2014 European elections the party supported both abstentionism or voting for the Galician Nationalist Bloc.

Ideology
The party considers independence its main objective. The party also supports socialism, feminism and the autonomy of the social movements.

2015 arrests and process against the organization
On the 31 of October 2015 9 members of Causa Galiza were arrested under the accusation of being members of Resistência Galega and of "glorifying terrorism" All the activities of the organization have been banned by the Audiencia Nacional for a period of two years, and Causa Galiza could be fully banned. In December 2016 the party was legalized again

References

External links
Official website 

2012 establishments in Spain
Formerly banned political parties in Spain
Formerly banned socialist parties
Galician nationalist parties
Left-wing nationalist parties
Political parties established in 2012
Pro-independence parties
Political parties in Galicia (Spain)
Secessionist organizations in Europe
Socialist parties in Galicia (Spain)